Tikrit (Akkar)   (also Tekrit) is a  town in Akkar Governorate, Lebanon.

The population of Tikrit is mostly Greek Orthodox Christian or Sunni Muslim.

History
In 1838, Eli Smith noted  the village as 'Tekrit,  located south of esh-Sheikh Mohammed. The  inhabitants were Sunni Muslim or Greek Orthodox Christians.

References

Bibliography

External links
Tikrit, Localiban 

Populated places in Akkar District
Sunni Muslim communities in Lebanon
Eastern Orthodox Christian communities in Lebanon